State Route 81 (SR 81) is a  state highway in northeastern Tennessee. It travels in Unicoi and Washington counties. It connects Fall Branch with Erwin.

Route description
SR 81 beings in Unicoi County at an interchange with I-26/US 23/US 19W (Exit 37) in Erwin (with the road continuing south as SR 107). It goes north from this interchange concurrent with SR 107. The two routes leave Erwin and continue north to parallel the Nolichucky River before crossing into Washington County.

SR 81/SR 107 continue north to pass through Embreeville, where they cross over a bridge over the Nolichucky River, before entering the community of Lamar, where SR 107 turns west and SR 81 continues north. SR 81 then crosses a second bridge over the Nolichucky River before having an intersection with SR 67. The highway then leaves Lamar and the Nolichucky River to continue north through rural farmland before having an intersection with SR 353 and entering Jonesborough. SR 81 then enters downtown and has intersections with two roads that provide access to U.S. Routes 11E and 321 and SR 34, Persimmon Ridge Road and Washington Drive. SR 81 then leaves Jonesborough and continues north through rural areas to junction with SR 75.

Junction list

See also

References

081
Transportation in Washington County, Tennessee